Al Hefaiyah Mountain Conservation Centre is a wildlife reserve and visitor centre located west of the coastal town of Kalba in the Emirate of Sharjah, the United Arab Emirates (UAE).

Facilities 
Opened in 2016, the Conservation Centre is a  wildlife sanctuary and visitor centre, with some 30 animals preserved at the centre, including Arabian leopards, which are thought to now be extinct in the wild in the United Arab Emirates. It has been hailed as a major step forward in the conservation of endangered mountain species in the UAE, and in 2016, won the Middle East Architect educational project of the year award.

Fauna 

Developed by the Sharjah Investment and Development Authority (Shurooq), the Centre is operated by the Sharjah Environment and Protected Areas Authority. The centre comprises a number of landscape enclosures in which mountain fauna are housed in their natural environment. Many of the species housed at the centre were previously at Sharjah's Breeding Centre for Endangered Arabian Wildlife (BCEAW) and are indigenous to the regions of Wadi Al Helo, Khor Fakkan, and Kalba in Al Hajar Mountains.

Outdoor animals include Arabian leopard, rock hyrax, gazelle, caracal, Arabian tahr, Arabian wolf, and striped hyena. In addition to the critically endangered leopard, the Arabian wolf (Canis lupus arabs) and Arabian tahr (Arabitragus jayakari) are designated threatened species by the International Union for Conservation of Nature (IUCN).

Smaller species are housed indoors at the centre and include snakes, lizards and hedgehogs.

Visitors to the centre travel around the outdoor areas in golf buggies with guides, with a number of hides set up to allow the animals to be observed in their natural habitat. The centre also plays host to art exhibitions and other events.

Artworks 
The centre houses several permanent artworks commissioned by the EPPA (Environment and Protected Areas Authority), including six sound installations by Bradley-Weaver, local designer Khalid Mezaina and artist Joris De Raedt.

See also 
 Al Ain Zoo
 Emirates Park Zoo
 Dubai Dolphinarium
 Dubai Safari Park
 Dubai Zoo
 Gulf of Oman

References

External links 
 مركز الحفية لصون البيئة الجبلية (In Arabic)
 مركز الحفية لصون البيئة الجبلية .. مشروع مزج التثقيف بالمعرفة (YouTube)
 مركز الحفية لصون البيئة الجبلية ومركز كلباء للطيور الجارحة في الشارقة
 Al Hefaiyah Mountain Conservation Centre | Kalba | Location
 Visiting Al Hefaiyah Mountain Conservation Centre in Kalba Sharjah 27.09.2018
 Arabian Tahr (Arabitragus jayakari) at Al Hefaiyah Mountain Conservation Centre in Kalba Sharjah
 
 
 
 

Wildlife sanctuaries of the United Arab Emirates
Wildlife conservation
Sharjah articles
Zoos in the United Arab Emirates